Mouths of Rain: An Anthology of Black Lesbian Thought is a nonfiction debut anthology edited by Briona Simone Jones. It includes essays, poetry, and other writings by Black lesbian feminists such as Audre Lorde, Cheryl Clarke, and Bettina Love. The book was published by The New Press on February 1, 2021. The book received the Judy Grahn Award and the Lambda Literary Award for Anthology.

Synopsis 
Mouths of Rain is a compilation of writings spanning 1909 - 2019 from Black lesbian women and others who have had intimate relationships with other Black women. It was intended as a companion to Words of Fire by Beverly Guy-Sheftall, and contains writings by: Alice Walker, Cheryl Clarke, Audre Lorde, Pauli Murray, Barbara Smith, and Bettina Love.

The contents include essays, poetry, short fiction, and personal recollections. The anthology is divided into five sections, each with a different broad focus: uses of the erotic; interlocking oppressions and identity politics; coming out and stepping into; the sacred; and radical futurities. Topics covered include sexism, Afrofuturism, and white reviewers.

The editor, Briona Simone Jones, is a Black lesbian feminist of African American and Jamaican descent. She received her doctoral degree in English from Michigan State University in 2021. Jones' stated goal was to "trace the trajectories of liberation, from self to community, through Black lesbian thought."

Reception 
Mouths of Rain received positive critical reception. Library Journal gave the anthology a starred review in which Ahliah Bratzler wrote "an essential component to any social science shelf, this is transformative, vital reading." Charles Green of Lambda Literary praised the collection as a "timely anthology of writings that will certainly spark conversations, connections, and ideas, both within the community and beyond." Publishers Weekly referred to it as "inspiring and prodigious."

Publication

Accolades 

 2022 – Winner, Lambda Literary Award for Anthology
 2022 – Winner, The Judy Grahn Award for Lesbian Nonfiction

See also 
 Black lesbian literature in the United States
 Black feminism

References

External links 
 Official website

2020s LGBT literature
2021 anthologies
2021 non-fiction books
Black feminist books
Literature by African-American women
Lesbian feminist books
LGBT African-American culture
LGBT non-fiction books
LGBT literature in the United States
The New Press books
LGBT anthologies